James Edward Geygan (June 3, 1903 – March 15, 1966) was an American shortstop in Major League Baseball. Born in Ironton, Ohio, he played for the Boston Red Sox from 1924 to 1926. He died at age 62 in Columbus, Ohio.

He managed in the minor leagues from 1936 to 1941, primarily in the Ohio State League, with the Sandusky Sailors and Fremont Green Sox.

External links

1903 births
1966 deaths
People from Ironton, Ohio
Major League Baseball shortstops
Boston Red Sox players
Baseball players from Ohio
Minor league baseball managers
Waterbury Brasscos players
Columbus Senators players
Louisville Colonels (minor league) players
Milwaukee Brewers (minor league) players
Wichita Falls Spudders players
Shreveport Sports players
Sandusky Sailors players
Marion Presidents players
Fremont Reds players
Fremont Green Sox players
Superior Blues players